(Lord, when our insolent enemies snort), BWV 248VI (also written as BWV 248 VI), is a church cantata for Epiphany, which Johann Sebastian Bach composed as the sixth part of his Christmas Oratorio, written for the Christmas season of 1734–35 in Leipzig.

History

Bach had been presenting church cantatas for the Christmas season in the Thomaskirche (St. Thomas) and Nikolaikirche (St. Nicholas) since his appointment as director musices in Leipzig in 1723, including these cantatas for Epiphany:
 As part of his first cantata cycle: Sie werden aus Saba alle kommen, BWV 65, first performed in 1724.
 As part of his second cantata cycle: Liebster Immanuel, Herzog der Frommen, BWV 123, first performed in 1725.

Cantata fragment BWV 248 VI a
, also indicated as BWV 248a, is a fragment of a cantata, transmitted without text, the opening chorus of which Bach likely borrowed from So kämpfet nur, ihr muntern Töne, BWV 1160, one of his secular cantatas. Picander wrote the libretto of the BWV 1160 cantata (also known as ), which otherwise, that is, apart from the likely borrowed opening chorus, survived without music.

While nothing more survives of the Michaelmas cantata as such, the four revised performance parts show that most of its music, including the music of its opening chorus and recitatives, was parodied in Part VI of the Christmas Oratorio.

Music and content

 is scored for 3 trumpets, timpani, 2 oboes, 2 oboes d'amore, 2 violin parts, 1 viola part and continuo.

References

Sources
 
 
 
 
 
 

Church cantatas by Johann Sebastian Bach
1735 compositions